The marketing supply chain is the chain of suppliers that an organization relies on to produce marketing materials (print, promotional products and point of sale) to market their products and services.

The marketing supply chain is often made up of partners inside and outside of the organization – such as brand managers, marketing services, agencies, direct sales teams, buyers, printers, fulfillment houses and many others.

From product brochures and promotional flyers to point-of-sale systems and store signage, each of these supplies must be acquired, managed and distributed to customers, sales teams, branch offices, retail outlets, dealers, distributors and other key audiences around the world.

Flow
Similar to manufacturing environments, marketing supply chains are primarily governed by a process or "flow" that typically involves:
 Creation – identifying and developing marketing materials to meet customer need and/or to support sales initiatives,
 Production – getting materials in their final form either through sourcing, printing or Web development,
 Warehousing – technology, storage strategy, planning,
 Fulfillment – order management, service standards, shipping and tracking use/consumption – how materials are used and displayed in the field and stored based on seasonality or product/service availability,
 Feedback – collecting information for continuous refinement; from inventory reporting, management metrics, field/customer feedback.

Technology
The technology field for meeting the needs to the entire marketing supply chain is still a bit disconnected. A new breed of comprehensive  Marketing Management Platforms are on their way to the market. These platforms enable marketers to give access to their marketing materials to anyone that is responsible for promoting the brand. This could include sales teams, employees, vendors, partners, affiliates or anyone else the marketer determines needs the access. In general these platforms are tasked with the following features:
 Protect the brand, protect the budget and protect the inventory: As marketers open up the access for people to pull marketing materials through automated methods there must be controls in place to ensure they are being used in compliance with the corporate directives.
 Promote the brand; Physically, Digitally and Socially: The platforms must be able to support a number of different mediums to be able to truly handle the entire marketing supply chain.
 Propagate the materials; Quickly, Easily and Efficiently: With complex supply chains these technologies must be able to connect to multiple vendors/manufacturers and ensure they have the ability to quickly produce, procure and fulfill the materials to the targeted destination.

Over time, most supply chains can grow cumbersome and unwieldy as new partners, new products and new technologies are added, resulting in increased cost, decreased service levels and an overall loss of control. Some of the world’s largest consulting firms estimate that up to 60% of marketing costs are related to non-product ancillary areas (distribution, people, freight, storage, obsolescence, technology, inventory management, etc.).

Companies have tackled cost reduction from a "largest spend first" philosophy. As a result, some very substantial cost savings opportunities are often overlooked, such as indirect materials and supplies – those products and services that are not a core or direct part of the company’s finished product.

By taking a complete marketing supply chain approach, identifying inefficiencies and developing best business practices, companies can improve their marketing supply chain process. Outsourcing the process can help manage total marketing supply chain cost, and can provide an opportunity for measurement in marketing, one of the major challenges in the profession.

Supply chain management